Armazic is an extinct written Aramaic language used as a language of administration in the South Caucasus in the first centuries AD. Both the Armazic language and script were related to the Aramaic of northern Mesopotamia. The name "Armazic" was introduced by the Georgian scholar Giorgi Tsereteli in reference to Armazi, an ancient site near Mtskheta, Georgia, where several specimens of a local idiom of written Aramaic have been found. Beyond several sites in eastern Georgia, an Armazic-type inscription is also present on the temple of Garni in Armenia. The latest specimen of Armazic is an inscription of a 3rd-century plate from Bori, Georgia.

References

Aramaic languages
Languages of Iran
Extinct languages of Asia
Languages of Georgia (country)
Languages attested from the 1st century
Languages extinct in the 2nd century